Norbury and Ellaston railway station was on a branch of the North Staffordshire Railway between  and . The station, which had a waiting room, ticket office, and stationmaster's office, and two side platforms, opened at Norbury, Derbyshire in 1852.

Regular passenger services ended in 1954, freight finished in 1956. Occasional excursion trains and specials continued to use the station until it was officially closed in 1958. The line closed in 1963 and the track lifted.

Route

See also
 Cromford and High Peak Railway

References

Disused railway stations in Derbyshire
Peak District
Former North Staffordshire Railway stations
Railway stations in Great Britain opened in 1852
Railway stations in Great Britain closed in 1958
1852 establishments in England